Nakat Bay is a bay in Southeast Alaska, United States. The bay extends northeast  from Cape Fox. It was charted in 1793 by George Vancouver. The bay's name comes from a Tlingit name published in 1853 on a Russian Hydrographic Department chart as "Bukh(ta) Nakat" (English: Nakat Bay).

References

Bays of Alaska
Bodies of water of Ketchikan Gateway Borough, Alaska